Haskell is a masculine given name which may refer to:

 Haskell Boggs (1909–2003), American cinematographer
 Haskell Cohen (1914–2000), public relations director of the National Basketball Association (1950–1969), creator of the NBA All-Star Game
 Haskell Curry (1900–1982), American mathematician and logician
 Haskell Garrett (born 1998), American football player
 Haskell Monroe (1931–2017), American educator and university administrator
 Haskell L. Nichols (died 1991), American politician
 Haskell Noyes (1886–1948), American college basketball player and coach and conservationist
 Haskell Small (born 1948), American composer, pianist and music teacher
 Haskell Wexler (1922–2015), American cinematographer, film producer and director

See also
 William Haskell Coffin (1878–1941), often known by his middle name, American painter

English-language masculine given names